Pulver-Bird House is a historic home located at Stanford in Dutchess County, New York.  It was built in 1839 and has a two-story center block with flanking one-story wings in the Greek Revival style.  It features a monumental tetrastyle portico supported by four Doric order columns.  Also on the property is a frame ice house and frame barn.

It was added to the National Register of Historic Places in 2008.

References

Houses on the National Register of Historic Places in New York (state)
Greek Revival houses in New York (state)
Houses completed in 1839
Houses in Dutchess County, New York
National Register of Historic Places in Dutchess County, New York